Musicology is the twenty-eighth studio album by American recording artist Prince. The album was given to concertgoers at his Musicology Tour, from March 27 to September 9, 2004, in North America. A digital release followed two days after his tour started on March 29, 2004. The physical retail version was released on April 19, 2004 (Europe) and April 20, 2004 (US) by NPG Records and distributed by Columbia Records. Musicology was the first album in five years (ten as Prince) that Prince released through a major label (Sony Music) and, being partially recorded in Mississauga, Ontario, Canada, was his first to be recorded outside Minneapolis in many years. Musicology is R&B themed.

Receiving generally positive reviews from music critics, Musicology proved to be Prince's most successful record in years, peaking at number three on the Billboard 200 and reaching top 10 in ten other countries. It was Prince's first album to chart in the US since The Rainbow Children (2001).

Prince won Grammy Awards for Best Traditional R&B Vocal Performance for "Musicology" and Best Male R&B Vocal Performance for "Call My Name". By January 2005, Musicology was certified double platinum by the Recording Industry Association of America (RIAA). At the time of release, Prince was quoted as saying he wished Musicology to provide musical education to listeners.

Commercial performance 
Musicology quickly proved to be Prince's most successful album since Diamonds and Pearls, reaching the Top 5 in the United States, United Kingdom and Germany and making a significant impression on charts around the world. It also proved to be well received by music critics. The title track was only released as a single in Australia, where it enjoyed moderate chart success and airplay. However it was also a hit on the US R&B charts through airplay. The album was certified platinum by The  RIAA in June 2004 and was certified double platinum in late January 2005.

Part of the album's chart success was due to concertgoers receiving a copy of Musicology, with the album cost included in the ticket price for the Musicology Tour. This prompted Billboard magazine and Nielsen SoundScan to change its chart data methodology. For future album releases, Billboard said that customers "must be given an option to either add the CD to the ticket purchase or forgo the CD for a reduced ticket-only price." A purple vinyl edition was released in February 2019.

Critical reception 

Musicology received generally positive reviews from music critics. In his review for The Village Voice, critic Robert Christgau said that after the album's opening uptempo songs, "pleasant shocks lurk near the surface and go against the flow of the quality material, and almost everything packs payback". In a less enthusiastic review, Mojo magazine found it better produced and performed than it was written.

Accolades 
Prince won two Grammy Awards, for Best Traditional R&B Vocal Performance ("Musicology") and Best R&B Vocal Performance—Male ("Call My Name"), and was nominated for Best Pop Vocal Performance—Male ("Cinnamon Girl"), Best R&B Song (awarded to the songwriter) ("Call My Name"), and Best R&B Album (Musicology). Prince was chosen by Rolling Stone magazine's readers as the best male performer and most welcome comeback.

Tour 
Prince toured North America from March 27 to September 9, 2004 to promote Musicology. The tour was often billed as the Musicology Live 2004ever, or more commonly, the Musicology Tour. The tour earned $87.4 million and was attended by 1.47 million fans Although the tour promoted Musicology, only a select few tracks from the album were played during the concerts. The title track, "Musicology", and the two singles, "Call My Name" and "Cinnamon Girl", were among them. The tour featured many of Prince's more famous tracks, such as "Little Red Corvette", "Raspberry Beret", "Kiss", and "Purple Rain". A copy of Musicology was included with every concert ticket sold.

Track listing 
All tracks written by Prince.

Personnel 
 Prince – all vocals and instruments except as indicated
 Candy Dulfer – vocals on "Life 'o' the Party" and "Cinnamon Girl", saxophone on "Life 'o' the Party", horns on "The Marrying Kind", "If Eye Was the Man in Ur Life" and "On the Couch"
 Chance Howard – vocals on "Life 'o' the Party", "Call My Name" and "Cinnamon Girl"
 Stokley – vocals on "Call My Name"
 Kip Blackshire – vocals on "Call My Name"
 Clare Fischer – strings on "Call My Name"
 Rhonda Smith – vocals on "Cinnamon Girl", bass on "Dear Mr. Man"
 John Blackwell – drums on "The Marrying Kind", "If Eye Was the Man in Ur Life", "On the Couch" and "Dear Mr. Man"
 Maceo Parker – horns on "The Marrying Kind", "If Eye Was the Man in Ur Life" and "On the Couch"
 Greg Boyer – horns on "The Marrying Kind", "If Eye Was the Man in Ur Life" and "On the Couch"
 Ornella Bonaccorsi – Italian speech on "What Do U Want Me 2 Do?"
 Sheila E. – shaker on "Dear Mr. Man"
 Renato Neto – Fender Rhodes on "Dear Mr. Man"

Singles 
 "Musicology" (#25 US Bubbling Under, #3 US R&B)
 "Call My Name" (#75 US)
 "Cinnamon Girl" (UK)

Charts

Weekly charts

Year-end charts

Certifications

References

External links 
 Album review at New York
 

2004 albums
Prince (musician) albums
Albums produced by Prince (musician)
Albums recorded at Metalworks Studios
NPG Records albums
Columbia Records albums